DTW is an abbreviation that may refer to:
 Detroit Metropolitan Wayne County Airport, the IATA airport code, an airport in Romulus, Michigan, near Detroit
 Droitwich Spa railway station, the National Rail station code, a railway station in Worcestershire, England
 Dynamic time warping, a pattern matching algorithm
Dance Theater Workshop, a performance venue in New York City, New York
Deworm the World Initiative, an initiative for school-based deworming around the world